The Paita Province is one of eight provinces of the Piura Region in northwestern Peru.

Location 
The province is located along the pacific coast. Its capital city, Paita, is one of the main ports of Peru..

Boundaries 
North Talara Province, Sullana Province
East Sullana Province
South Piura Province
West Sea of Grau.

Political division 
The Province is divided into seven districts, which are:

Paita
Amotape
Colan
La Huaca
Vichayal
Arenal
Tamarindo

Capital 
The capital of the province is the city of Paita.

See also 
Piura Region
Peru

External links 
  Official website of the Paita Province

1861 establishments in Peru
Provinces of the Piura Region